Khvajehi (also Romanized as Khvājehī; also known as Khvājeh and Khvājeh Yahūd) is a village in Khorram Makan Rural District, Kamfiruz District, Marvdasht County, Fars Province, Iran. At the 2006 census, its population was 755, in 152 families.

References 

Populated places in Marvdasht County